Middle Pyramid is a mountain in Linn County, Oregon.

Middle Pyramid is one of three different mountains in the area. There is South Pyramid, Middle Pyramid, and North Pyramid. Middle Pyramid is best known for the hike to the top. The summit has views of the Cascade Mountain Range. The mountain is located in the Willamette National Forest. The mountain stands 5,618 ft above sea level (1,712 m).

References

Mountains of Oregon

Mountains of Linn County, Oregon